, formerly known by his stage names  and , was a Japanese film and stage actor. He appeared in over 300 films between 1927 and 1963.

Career
Born to a sake brewing family in Kyoto, he first appeared on stage at age five in a theater run by his family as a side business. In 1918, he became a student of Nakamura Ganjirō I and performed kabuki in the Kansai region. He joined the Shochiku studio in 1927 and made his film debut in Chigo no kenpō under the name Chōjirō Hayashi. His good looks and graceful fighting style made him a major jidaigeki star, and he appeared in more than 120 films for Shochiku in 11 years, with the best works being directed by Teinosuke Kinugasa. The 1935 Yukinojō henge was a significant hit. He moved to the Toho studio in 1937. On 11 November 1937, however, he was attacked by ruffians and his face slashed with razor blades. According to the historian Daisuke Miyao, "Even though there was no clear evidence, it was widely assumed that this violent incident was Shochiku's retaliatory measure against Hayashi's so-called betrayal." He recovered and changed his stage name to his real name, Kazuo Hasegawa. Hasegawa appeared in many successful films for Toho, including several "national-policy pictures with Chinese settings", such as Song of the White Orchid (1939) and China Night (1940), with co-star Ri Koran. He moved to Daiei Film in 1950 and continued appearing in the popular Zenigata Heiji series. He also appeared in many classic films including Kozaburo Yoshimura's The Tale of Genji (1951), Kinugasa's Gate of Hell (1953), and Kenji Mizoguchi's The Crucified Lovers (1954). He was appointed to Daiei's board of directors in 1957. To celebrate his 300th film, Hasegawa appeared in a new version of Yukinojō henge (known abroad as An Actor's Revenge) in 1963 directed by Kon Ichikawa. He left Daiei that year and continued to appear on stage and television, including starring in the second NHK Taiga drama Akō Rōshi in 1964. He also directed the Takarazuka Revue version of The Rose of Versailles in 1974.

Selected filmography
Filmography of Kazuo Hasegawa include (incomplete):

 Chîgo no kênhô (1927) - Suda Ichijiro
 Ojo Kichiza (1927)
 Rangûn (1927)
 Oni azami (1927)
 Kinnoi jidai (1927)
 Itâwari no âsatarô (1927)
 Yâburê amikasâ (1927)
 Myôtoboshi (1927)
 Goyosen (1927)
 Akatsuki no yushi (1927)
 Kôrui (1927)
 Kômori zoshî (1927)
 Gekka no kyôto (1927)
 Tenpô hikenrôku (1927)
 Meoto boshi (1927)
 Benten kozo (1928) - Benten Kozo Kikunosuke
 Kyôrakû hîcho (1928)
 Kaikokuki (1928) - Shirigoro
 Fûun jôshi (1928) - Aizawa Shinpachi
 Chokun yasha (1928)
 Kagaribi (1928)
 Shirai gonachi (1928)
 Ôse no hangoro (1928)
 Kaitô Samimaro (1928)
 Kên no chikemuri (1928)
 Ninpinîn (1928)
 Edo sodachi (1928)
 Shîgurêgasâ (1928)
 Kirare yosa (1928)
 Ningyô bushi (1928)
 Jujiro (十字路) (also known as Crossroads, Crossways, Shadows of the Yoshiwara or Slums of Tokyo) (1928)
 Tôribêyama shinjû (1928) - Kikuchi Hankuro 
 Kurotegumi Sukeroku (1929)
 Jigoku kaidô (1929)
 Ôbo kîchiza (1929)
 Fubuki tôge (1929)
 Omokage (1929)
 Yari no gonza (1929)
 Tsukigata hanpeita (1929)
 Ise ondo (1929)
 Sanzâ shigure (1929)
 Chi ni somuku mono (1929)
 Kurueru meikun (1929) - 'Sakyônosuke' Hidenao
 Nogitsune Sanji (1930) - Nogitsune Sanji
 Naozamurai (1930)
 Fuyuki shinju (1930)
 Matsudaira Chôshichirô (1930)
 Seki no yatappe (1930)
 Nâniwa kâgamî (1930)
 Katawa bina (1930)
 Hakaranno uta (go) (1930)
 Sâtsunan sôdoîn (1930)
 Fubuki ni sakebu ôkami (1931)
 Bîjobu sakyô zenpen (1931)
 Monsâburô no hide (1931)
 Reimei izen (1931)
 Îzayoi seishin (1931)
 Batô no zeni (1931, part 1, 2)
 Kagoya dainagôn (1931)
 Jonan no yôemon (1931)
 Nagebushi Yanosuke (1931, part 1, 2)
 Hîren kaênzukâ (1931)
 Chîyoda no ninjo (1931)
 Yajikitâ bijin sodoki (1932)
 Konjiki Yasha (1932) - Hazama Kanichi
 Tâbiwarajî kokyo no utâ (1932)
 Nezumikozô Jirokichi (1932, part 1, 2)
 Mâtsuriûta miyokîchi goroshî (1932)
 Rikugun daikôshin (1932)
 Edo gonomi Ryôgoku sôshi (1932)
 Kamiyui shinzô (1932)
 Hototogisu (1932)
 Kikugorô goshi zenpen (1932)
 Chûshingura (1932, part 1-3) - Asano Takuminokami / Yoshida Sawaemon
 Kikugorô koshi kohen (1932)
 Kyokyaku harusamegasa (1933) - Oguchiya Gyou
 Hôrimonô hagan (1933, part 1-3) - Toyama, Kinshiro and farmer Hyakunosuke
 Koina no Ginpei (1933) - Koina no Ginpei
 Ishii tsuneemon (1934)
 Yâshu honnoji (1934)
 Meireki meikenshi (1934)
 Yâkko kagamiyama (1934)
 Rînzo shusse tâbi (1934)
 Gênzaburô ihen no maki (1934, part 1, 2)
 Watashi no niisan (1934) - Fumio
 Kyôkaku Soga (1934)
 Haha no ai (1935)
 Rônintabi sasshô bosatsu (1935)
 Kagoya hangan (1935) - Echizen'nokami Ôoka
 Yukinojô henge (1935-1936, part 1, 2) - Yokinojo, Yamitaro and Yokinojo's mother
 Tenpô Yasubei (1935)
 Megumi no kenka (1935)
 Kurayami no Ushimatsu (1935)
 Hanamuko no negoto (1935) - Yasuo the Bridegroom
 Odoru meikun (1935)
 Tôribêyama shinjû: Osome Hankurô (1936) - Hankruô
 Onâtsu sejurô (1936) - Seijuro
 Harûsugatâ gonin otoko (1936)
 Arâkawa no Sakichi (1936)
 Suzugamori (1937)
 Môko shûrai: Tekikoku kôfuku; Shishi-hen (1937) - Tokimune Hôjô
 Tsûchiyâ Chikara: Râkka no make (1937) - Tsuchiya Chikara / Sugino Jubeita
 Tabi no kagerô (1937)
 Sêkkai no maki (1937)
 Ôsaka natsu no jin (1937) - Sakazaki Izumo no kami
 Bancho sarayashiki (1937)
 Tôjûrô no koi (1938) - Sakata Tojuro
 Mabuta no haha (1938) - Kondo
 Tsuruhachi and Tsurujiro (1938) - Tsurujirō
 Gekka no wakamusha (1938)
 Rônin fubuki (1939) - Kazuemon Fuwa / Asano Takuminokami
 Ninjutsu hyakuju gassen (1939, part 1, 2)
 Têkketsû ippon gatanâ (1939)
 Hagakure tengu (1939)
 Chushingura (1939, part 1, 2) - Asano Takuminokami
 Kenka tobi (1939, part 1, 2) - Kichigorô
 Kappa dai-kassen (1939) - Kyôma Yûki
 Byakuran no uta: zenpen: kôhen (1939) - Kokichi Matsumura
 Josô ninjutsu igaryû (1939)
 Gozonji azuma otoko (1939)
 Echigo jishi matsuri (1939)
 Kenpû hyakumangoku (1940)
 Gôketsu sanbagarasu (1940)
 Tôryû musha ningyô (1940)
 Hebihimesama (1940) - Sentarô
 Goto matabei (1940)
 Moyuru ôzora (1940)
 Shina no yoru (1940, part 1-4) - Tetsuo Hase
 Zoku Hebihimesama (1940) - Hinokiya Sentarô
 Aozora kaidô (1940)
 Orizuru dainagon (1940)
 Akatsuki no shinshu (1940)
 Kinnô onshû tôge (1940)
 Reimei no ezochi (1940)
 Nessa no chikai (Zenpen; Kôhen) (1940) - Kenji Sugiyama
 Moyuru daichi (1940) - Lt. Ohashi
 Adaûchi goyomi (1940)
 Kinô kieta otoko (1941) - Bunkichi
 Hasegawa Roppa no Iemitsu to Hikoza (1941) - Iemitsu Tokugawa / Yukie Kawamura
 Orizo nan henge (go) (1941)
 Kawanakajima kassen (1941) - Hyakuzô
 Otoko no hanamichi (1941) - Utaemon Nakamura III
 Awa no odoriko (1941) - Man Who Returns
 Matte ita otoko (1942)
 Onna keizu (1942, part 1, 2) - Hayase
 Omokage no machi (1942)
 Ina no Kantarô (1943) - Ina no Kantarô
 Ongaku dai-shingun (1943)
 Meijin Chôji-bori (1943) - Chôji
 Susume dokuritsuki (1943) - Kinugasa / Imai
 Himetaru kakugo (1943) - Fumio Abe
 Idaten kaido (1944) - Hagiwara
 Shibaidô (1944)
 Inochi no minato (1944)
 Ato ni tsuzuku o shinzu (1944) - Company Commander Wakabayashi
 Sanjûsangen-dô, tôshiya monogatari (1945) - Kanbei Kanzamon
 Aru yo no Tonosama (1946)
 Tôhô sen'ichi-ya (1947)
 Kyô wa odote (1947) - Watanabe
 Ôedo no oni (1947)
 Bonbon (1947) - Yatarô
 Yûrei akatsuki ni shisu (1948) - Heitarô Obata / Koheita
 Kobanzame zenpen (1948)
 Hasegawa Kazuo no Zenigata Heiji Torimonohikae: Heiji Happyakuyacho (1949) - Zenigata Heiji
 Kobanzame (1949)
 Koga yashiki (1949) - Genzaburo
 Hebi hime dochu (1949)
 Zoku hebi hime dochu (1950)
 Jogashima no ame (1950)
 Hi no tori (1950)
 Ashura hangan (1950)
 Tsuki no wataridori (1951) - Ginpei
 Meigetsu somato (1951)
 The Tale of Genji (1951) - Hikaru Genji
 Genji monogatari (1951) - Hikaru Genji
 Dedication of the Great Buddha (1952) - Kunihito Tateto
 Shurajô hibun (1952, part 1, 2) - Momotarô / Shin'nosuke
 Fuun senryobune (1952)
 Kantarou tsukiyo-uta (1952) - Kantarou
 Jirokichi kôshi (1952)
 Furisode kyôjo (1952) - Yaemon at Shinade
 Asama no karasu (1953) - Giro Kutsukake
 Kinsei mei shôbu monogatari: Hana no Kôdôkan (1953) - Hideyuki Mishima
 Shishi no za (1953) - Yagorô Hôshô
 Gate of Hell (1953) - Moritoo Endô
 Omatsuri hanjirô (1953) - Hanjiro Kotani
 Zenigata Heiji: Ghost Lord (銭形平次捕物控　幽霊大名 Zenigata Heiji Torimono-Hikae: Yūrei Daimyō) (1954)
 The Crucified Lovers (1954) - Mohei
 Yoidore ni tôryû (1954) - Nakayama Yasubee
 Hana no nagadosu (1954) - Monjirô
 Banchô sara yashiki: Okiku to Harima (1954)
 Itarô jishi (1955)
 Nanatsu no kao no ginji (1955)
 A Girl Isn't Allowed to Love (1955) - Gofû Yamamura
 Tōjūrō no Koi (藤十郎の恋) (1955) - Tojuro Sakata
 Ore wa Tokichiro (1955)
 Ishigassen (1955)
 Hana no Wataridori (1956)
 Shin, Heike monogatari: Yoshinaka o meguru sannin no onna (1956) - Jirô-Yoshinaka Kiso
 Zangiku monogatari (残菊物語) (1956) - Kikunosuke
 Zenigata Heiji Torimono no Hikae (1956, part 1, 2)
 Tsukigata Hanpeita: Hana no maki; Arashi no maki (1956) - Hanpeita Tsukigata
 A Fantastic Tale of Naruto (1957) - Gennojo Norizuki
 Zenigata Heiji torimono hikae: madara hebi (1957)
 Yuki no wataridori (1957)
 Ukifune (1957) - Kaoru-no-kimi
 Yûkyô Gonin Otoko (1958)
 Edokko matsuri (1958) - Tasuke Isshin
 The Loyal 47 Ronin (忠臣蔵 Chūshingura) (1958) - Kuranosuke Ôishi
 Hana no yukyo-den (1958)
 Nichiren to mōko daishūrai (1958) - Nichiren
 Iga no suigetsu (1958)
 Kagerô-gasa (1959) - Yatarô
 Onna to kaizoku (1959) - Shogor Ozaki
 Yamada Nagamasa - Oja no ken (1959) - Nagamasa Yamada
 Jirôchô Fuji (1959) - Shimizu no Jirôchô
 Yotsuya Kaidan (1959) - Iemon Tamiya
 Utamaro wo meguru gonin no onna (1959)
 Seki no yatappe (1959)
 Zenigata Heiji torimono hikae (1960-1961, part 1, 2)
 The Demon of Mount Oe (1960) - Shuten-dōji
 San'nin no kaoyaku (1960) - Ryûtarô Tsumura
 Kizu senryô (1960) - Chouemon Takakura
 Ippon-gatana dohyô iri (1960)
 Zoku Jirocho Fuji (1960) - Shimizu no Jirôchô
 San kyôdai no kettô (1960) - Inoue
 Futari no musashi (1960) - Hirata Musashi
 Furaî monogatari-âbara hishâ (1960)
 Harekosode (1961)
 Sakurada mon (1961)
 Mito komon umi o wataru (1961)
 Kuroi sandogasa (1961)
 Sabakareru Echizen no kami (1962) - Ichijûrô Ôoka
 Aobajô no oni (1962) - Kai Harada
 Shin no shikôtei (1962)
 An Actor's Revenge (1963) - Yukinojo Nakamura / Yamitaro the Thief
 Edo mujô (1963) - Awajinokami Wakisaka
 Ako Roshi (1964, Taiga drama, TV Series)

Honours 
Kikuchi Kan Prize (1957)
Medal with Purple Ribbon (1965)
Order of the Sacred Treasure, 3rd class, Gold Rays with Neck Ribbon (1978)
People's Honour Award (1984)

References

External links

 Film Reference Actors and Actresses 4th Edition. pages 540- . / 

1908 births
1984 deaths
Film studio executives
Japanese male film actors
Japanese male stage actors
Japanese theatre directors
Kabuki actors
People from Kyoto
People's Honour Award winners
Recipients of the Medal with Purple Ribbon
Taiga drama lead actors
20th-century Japanese male actors